This article gives an overview of liberalism and centrism in Sweden. It is limited to liberal and centrist parties with substantial support, mainly proved by having had a representation in parliament. The sign ⇒ denotes another party in that scheme. For inclusion in this article it isn't necessary for parties to have labelled themselves as a liberal party.

Background
Liberalism has been a major force in Sweden since the 19th century. And even before then, personalities like Anders Chydenius (1729 – 1803), promoted the ideals of liberalism. Nowadays The Liberals (Liberalerna, member of LI and ALDE) calls itself a centre-right liberal party. The Centre Party (Centerpartiet, member of LI and ALDE) is a historically agrarian party that has gradually developed into a liberal party. Since their party congress in 2013, they define themselves as a green, liberal party.

History

From People's Party to The Liberals
1895: The liberal wing of the Old Party of the Gentry (''Gamla Lantmannapartiet) seceded and formed the People's Party (Folkpartiet)
1900: The liberals are reorganised into the Liberal Coalition Party/Freeminded National Association (Liberala Samlingspartiet/Frisinnade Landsföreningen)
1922: The party fell apart into the Freeminded People's Party/Freeminded National Association (Frisinnade Folkpartiet/Frisinnade Landsföreningen) and the ⇒ Liberal Party of Sweden
1934: Both parties re-united into the People's Party (Folkpartiet)
1990: The party is renamed People's Party - The Liberals (Folkpartiet Liberalerna)
2015: The party shortened its name to The Liberals (Liberalerna).

Liberal Party of Sweden
1922: The Liberal Coalition Party fell apart into the ⇒ Freeminded People's Party and the Liberal Party of Sweden (Sveriges Liberala Parti)
1934: Both parties re-united into the ⇒ People's Party

Centre Party
1958: The agrarian Rural Party - Farmers' League (Landbygdspartiet Bondeförbundet) renamed itself into Centre Party (Centerpartiet'') and evolved gradually from an agrarian into a more liberal direction.

Liberal leaders
Folkpartiet/Liberalerna: Bertil Ohlin - Gunnar Helén - Per Ahlmark - Ola Ullsten - Bengt Westerberg - Maria Leissner - Lars Leijonborg - Jan Björklund - Nyamko Sabuni
Centerpartiet: Thorbjörn Fälldin - Maud Olofsson - Annie Lööf

Liberal thinkers
In the Contributions to liberal theory the following Swedish thinkers are included:

Anders Chydenius (1729–1803)
Ivan Bratt (1878–1956)
Bertil Ohlin (1899–1979)

See also
 History of Sweden
 Politics of Sweden
 List of political parties in Sweden

References

 
Sweden
Politics of Sweden
Sweden